Tel Patriq was a diocese of the Syriac Orthodox Church near Melitene (Malatya), attested during the eleventh and twelfth centuries.

Sources 

The main primary source for the Jacobite bishops of Tel Patriq is the record of episcopal consecrations appended to Volume III of the Chronicle of the Jacobite patriarch Michael the Syrian (1166–99).  In this Appendix Michael listed most of the bishops consecrated by the Jacobite patriarchs of Antioch between the ninth and twelfth centuries.  Twenty-eight Jacobite patriarchs sat during this period, and in many cases Michael was able to list the names of the bishops consecrated during their reigns, their monasteries of origin, and the place where they were consecrated.

Location 
Tel Patriq was a locality near Melitene (modern Malatya), on the west bank of the Euphrates river, in Turkey.

Bishops of Tel Patriq 
Five eleventh- and twelfth-century bishops of Tel Patriq are mentioned in the lists of Michael the Syrian.

Some of these bishops are mentioned again in other sources.  Dionysius (1004/30) was taken to Constantinople in 1029 with the patriarch Yohannan VII bar Abdon on the orders of the Byzantine emperor Romanus III Argyrus, and was imprisoned in an attempt to force him to make a Chalcedonian confession of faith.  He was later released and returned to govern his diocese.   Timothy (1058/1063) consecrated the patriarch Athanasius VII in the church of Rahta in Melitene in 1091.

The diocese of Tel Patriq is not again mentioned after 1091, and probably lapsed during the late-twelfth or thirteenth century.

Notes

References 
 
 
 Jean-Baptiste Chabot, Chronique de Michel le Syrien, Patriarche Jacobite d'Antiche (1166-1199). Éditée pour la première fois et traduite en francais I-IV (1899;1901;1905;1910; a supplement to volume I containing an introduction to Michael and his work, corrections, and an index, was published in 1924. Reprinted in four volumes 1963, 2010).

Syriac Orthodox dioceses
Oriental Orthodoxy in Turkey